This is list of women's football clubs in South Korea.

List

WK League

Defunct clubs
 Soongmin Wonders (1999.12.~2002.11.)
 Bucheon FMC Best WFC (2010.03~2010.12.)
 Chungnam Ilhwa Chunma (2006.03-2012.11.)

See also
List of women's association football clubs
List of football clubs in South Korea

External links 
 Korea Women's Football League team intro page

 
Women's football clubs
Korea Republic women

Football clubs, women's